David Bowie Narrates Prokofiev's Peter and the Wolf is a classical music album containing English musician David Bowie's narration of Sergei Prokofiev's 1936 composition Peter and the Wolf. Produced by Jay David Saks, the music is performed by the Philadelphia Orchestra conducted by Eugene Ormandy. Bowie recorded his narration in December 1977 at RCA Studio B in New York City after completing his promotional appearances for his album "Heroes" (1977). The album was released in May 1978 on the RCA Red Seal label. The LP also contained a recording of Benjamin Britten‘s The Young Person's Guide to the Orchestra on the B-side. It reached number 136 on the US Billboard Top LPs & Tape chart. The recording has received positive reviews from critics and Bowie's biographers, with Bowie's appearance garnering praise. It has since been reissued with different artworks.

Overview
Upon the completion of his promotional appearances for his 12th studio album, "Heroes" in November 1977, David Bowie went on holiday in Kenya. In December, he flew to New York City to RCA Studio B, where he recorded narration for an upcoming adaptation of Russian composer Sergei Prokofiev's Peter and the Wolf. According to biographer Thomas Jerome Seabrook, Prokofiev composed Peter and the Wolf in the 1930s with the intention of introducing younger children to orchestral music. The composition tells the story of a boy named Peter who travels outside his grandfather's garden in hopes of finding a big bad wolf. Each animal is represented by a different musical instrument, with a clarinet representing Peter's pet cat and a trio of French horns representing the wolf. Originally premiered in Moscow in 1936 to lukewarm reception, the composition remained relatively obscure in the western world until Walt Disney created an animated short based on it in 1946.

The project was not the first of its type. Musician Leonard Cohen had previously narrated a version of Peter and the Wolf for Decca Records in 1960, while actor Sean Connery narrated another in 1971, backed by the London Royal Philharmonic Orchestra. Biographer Chris O'Leary writes that there have been over 400 recordings of Peter and the Wolf, with Bowie's then-collaborator Brian Eno appearing on a 1975 recording narrated by Vivian Stanshall. For their version, RCA Records were initially keen on hiring actors Alec Guinness and Peter Ustinov, but both turned the project down, leading the label to hire their biggest contemporary star. Bowie later claimed that it was a Christmas present for his son, Duncan Jones, then seven years old.

For music, RCA commissioned the Philadelphia Orchestra conducted by Eugene Ormandy. Upon learning Bowie would provide narration, Ormandy was skeptical, with the project's producer, Jay David Saks, stating in 1983: "[Eugene] quite frankly didn't know who Bowie was, and when he found out he was a rock star he was a little concerned, to say the least." The Orchestra's live performance was recorded at the Scottish Rite Temple in Philadelphia on 8 October 1975. According to O'Leary, the orchestra consisted of a flute, oboe, clarinet, bassoon, three horns, trumpet, trombone, timpani, drum, two violins, viola, cello, and double bass.

David Bowie Narrates Prokofiev's Peter and the Wolf was released in May 1978 on the RCA Red Seal label, with the catalogue number RL-12743/ARL1-2743. It appeared with a recording of English composer Benjamin Britten's Young Person's Guide to the Orchestra on side B. Another musical drama, it uses symphonic orchestration to guide the story. The LP peaked at number 136 on the US Billboard Top LPs & Tape chart on 9 June, remaining on the chart for eight weeks.

Reception

David Bowie Narrates Prokofiev's Peter and the Wolf has received positive reviews from music critics, with many praising Bowie's appearance. Reviewing at the time of its release, Rolling Stones Stephen Demorest found Bowie's involvement "engaging and benevolent", finishing by saying Bowie had "found his most charming guise since Hunky Dory." Jon Savage of Sounds magazine praised the album, writing: "This is a perfect record if you have a young child and wish to give him/her an introduction into classical music, or if you're a 'child of all ages'." He further called Bowie's involvement "curious". One reviewer, who called the project "surprisingly refreshing", declared:

Joe Viglione in AllMusic found the album "charming" and Bowie's performance "splendid", describing the Philadelphia Orchestra's involvement as "first-rate". He finished by saying it was "a remarkable and well-crafted project". Bowie's biographers have also given the project positive assessments. Nicholas Pegg states: "While not to be compared with John Gielgud's definitive recording, Bowie's narration has genuine charm. This is an accomplished piece of work and a fascinating curio from a period in which his other unlikely collaborations embraced figures as diverse as Marc Bolan, Bing Crosby and Marlene Dietrich." Seabrook agrees, writing: "While projects such as this are easy to mock, only the most hard-hearted of listeners could deny that both Bowie, with his wide-eyed, enthusiastic delivery, and the Philadelphia Orchestra made a fine job of it." O'Leary calls Bowie's narration "charming", saying his performance as the cat is his finest on the record. However, he found his voice to be too low in the mix. Marc Spitz similarly calls the recording "charming".

At the 21st Annual Grammy Awards in 1979, Peter and the Wolf was nominated for Best Recording for Children, losing the award to The Muppet Show, the first soundtrack album to the television show of the same name.

Track listing

Side one
Peter and the Wolf, Op. 67 (Sergei Prokofiev) – 27:08

Side two
Young Person's Guide to the Orchestra, Op. 34 (Benjamin Britten) – 17:10
Narrated by Hugh Downs, accompanied by the Boston Pops Orchestra conducted by Arthur Fiedler

Release history

The original 1978 US version of the LP was pressed on green vinyl and included a liner notes insert. Later issues were pressing in standard black vinyl. A different album cover was used for 1992 US CD release depicting Bowie with wolf ears.

The album has been reissued a number of times on Compact Disc with varying extra tracks and three album covers. The most recent was released in 2014 by Sony Classical.

Personnel
According to Chris O'Leary:
David Bowie – narrator
Philadelphia Orchestra – all instruments
Eugene Ormandy – conductor

Production
Jay David Saks / Max Wilcox – producer
Paul Goodman – engineer
J.J. Stelmach – art direction
Mary Campbell – liner notes
Tom Kelley – cover photo

Charts

References

Sources

External links
 

David Bowie albums
RCA Records albums
1978 albums
Classical albums by English artists
Peter and the Wolf